The Division 2 season 2001/2002, organised by the LFP was won by AC Ajaccio and saw the promotions of AC Ajaccio, RC Strasbourg OGC Nice and Le Havre AC, whereas Nîmes Olympique and FC Martigues were relegated to National.

20 participating teams

 Ajaccio
 Amiens
 Beauvais
 Caen
 Châteauroux
 Créteil
 Grenoble
 Gueugnon
 Istres
 Laval
 Le Havre
 Le Mans
 Martigues
 Nancy
 Nice
 Nîmes
 Niort
 Saint-Étienne
 Strasbourg
 Wasquehal

League table

Recap
 Promoted to L1 : AC Ajaccio, RC Strasbourg, OGC Nice, Le Havre AC 
 Relegated to L2 : FC Metz, FC Lorient
 Promoted to L2 : Clermont Foot, Stade de Reims, ASOA Valence, Toulouse FC
 Relegated to National : Nîmes Olympique, FC Martigues

Results

Top goalscorers

External links
RSSSF archives of results

Ligue 2 seasons
French
2001–02 in French football